Urzy is a commune in the Nièvre department in central France.

See also
 Communes of the Nièvre department

References

External links
 Official website

Communes of Nièvre